Van Parijs is a Dutch surname. Notable people with the surname include:

Anne Van Parijs (born 1944), Belgian swimmer
Luk Van Parijs (born 1970), American biologist
Philippe Van Parijs (born 1951),  Belgian philosopher and political economist

Surnames of Dutch origin